Tigbao can refer to :

 the municipality of Tigbao, Zamboanga del Sur in the Philippines
 the barangay of Tigbao, Cagdianao, Dinagat Islands in the Philippines
 the Filipino word for a grass of the genus Acanthus, also known as Bear's breech 

See also: Tigbauan (Philippines)